John Beal "Sapho" Bartlett Jr. (December 24, 1889 – May 24, 1967) was an American baseball pitcher in the Negro leagues. He played with the Indianapolis ABCs from 1910 to 1914, the Lincoln Giants in 1913, and Jewell's ABCs in 1919. In some sources, his career is combined with that of Hop Bartlett.

References

External links
  and Seamheads

Indianapolis ABCs players
Lincoln Giants players
1889 births
1967 deaths
Baseball players from Indiana
Baseball pitchers
People from Indianapolis